This is a list of Catholic churches in Argentina.

Cathedrals
See: List of cathedrals in Argentina
Buenos Aires Metropolitan Cathedral
Cathedral of La Plata
Córdoba Cathedral, Argentina
Cathedral Basilica of Our Lady of the Rosary
San Isidro Cathedral

Basilicas

Other churches

See also
List of Roman Catholic dioceses in Argentina

Churches in Argentina
 
Argentina, Catholic
Argentina
Lists of religious buildings and structures in Argentina